Flash and the Pan were an Australian new wave musical group (essentially an ongoing studio project) formed in 1976 by Harry Vanda and George Young, both former members of the Easybeats; they were a production and songwriting team known as Vanda & Young. The group's first chart success was their 1976 debut single, "Hey, St. Peter", which reached number five in the Australian Kent Music Report Singles Chart. The next single, "Down Among the Dead Men", peaked at number four in Australia in 1978; it was re-titled as "And the Band Played On" for international release.

Their eponymous debut album followed in December 1978, featuring the track "Walking in the Rain", originally the B-side to "Hey St. Peter". The song was later covered by Grace Jones, and released as the last single from her album Nightclubbing (May 1981). Her version was most successful in New Zealand, reaching number 34. Flash and the Pan's second album, Lights in the Night (early 1980), peaked at No. 1 on the Swedish Albums Chart. "Waiting for a Train", the lead single from their third album, Headlines, reached number seven on the UK Singles Chart in 1983.

History 

Flash and the Pan were formed in Sydney, Australia, in mid-1976, initially as a studio-only pop rock band, by Harry Vanda and George Young both on guitar, keyboards and vocals. The duo had been the key creative members of the Easybeats, and subsequently worked as songwriters and producers, Vanda & Young, both in Australia and in the United Kingdom (UK). They were A&R agents for Albert Productions, and its in-house producers at Albert Studios in Sydney, from mid-1973.

Flash and the Pan's debut single, "Hey, St. Peter" was issued in September 1976 on Albert Productions, which they had co-written and co-produced "as an engaging diversion from the real job of record production for other artists." It peaked at No. 5 on the Kent Music Report Singles Chart in February 1977. Australian musicologist Ian McFarlane felt "[t]he music was based around an accessible, yet inventive synthesiser-based pop rock sound with an emphasis on George's spoken-word vocals and shouted chorus."

John Paul Young (no relation), speaking to Kathy McCabe of News Corp Australia, remembered the story of the song: "George was in New York chatting to the hotel doorman about the weather and the African American guy says 'Oh well, man, when my time comes, I am going to say to St Peter "You can't send me to hell, I have done my time in hell in New York!"' George just picked up things you and I would say and turn them into songs." John Paul Young had hit singles written and produced by Vanda & Young, including "Yesterday's Hero" (1975) and "Love Is in the Air" (1977).

"Hey, St. Peter" was released internationally in July 1977 on Mercury Records for continental Europe, where it reached No. 6 on the Belgian Ultratop 50 Singles chart and No. 7 on the Netherlands' Dutch Top 40. In the United Kingdom it appeared on the Ensign Records label, and for the North American market it was issued in July 1979 on Epic Records – it peaked at No. 76 on the Billboard Hot 100 in August of that year. "Down Among the Dead Men", their second single, was issued in Australia in July 1978, which peaked at No. 4 on the Kent Music Report. On the UK Singles Chart it reached No. 54 (re-titled "And the Band Played On"). In November they followed with their third single, "The African Shuffle".

The group's debut album, Flash and the Pan, was issued in Australia in December 1978 on Albert Productions, and internationally in the following year on Mercury, Ensign and Epic. It was recorded at Albert Studios in Sydney; the duo co-produced it and co-wrote nine of its ten tracks. Aside from Vanda and Young, the studio musicians included Ray Arnott on drums, Les Karski on bass guitar and Warren Morgan on piano. Arnott was signed by Vanda & Young to Alberts for a recording contract; Karski produced Arnott's solo debut album, Rude Dudes (1979), as well as providing bass guitar. The Ray Arnott Band, which included both Karski and Morgan, toured to support the album.

Although Flash and the Pan appeared on various national charts – including reaching No. 14 on Sweden's Swedish Albums Chart and No. 80 on the US Billboard 200 – the duo did not support its release with a tour: "[they] preferred the sanctity of their 24-track Albert Studio enclave." AllMusic's Steven McDonald rated the album as four-and-a-half stars out of five and explained, that it had "some seriously deranged songwriting, with quirky but attention-grabbing music peppered with pointy, strange lyrics. A soundtrack for the dark side of the moon that's well worth searching out."

For the group's second studio album, Lights in the Night (early 1980), Vanda and Young again used Arnott, Karski and Morgan. All eight tracks were co-written by Vanda and Young, who also co-produced it. The album reached the top 100 in Australia, and peaked at No. 1 on the Swedish Albums Chart in June. It provided two singles, "Welcome to the Universe" (July 1980) and "Media Man" (December 1980).

In October 1981, UK-based artist Grace Jones released her cover version of "Walking in the Rain", the B-side of "Hey, St. Peter", as a single, which peaked at No. 34 in New Zealand. Dmetri Kakmi provided Stereo Stories with his recollection of first hearing it: "I was transported. Vanda and Young's lyrics and Jones's detached delivery captured the restlessness, alienation and pent-up emotions of a stifled adolescence... By the end of the track I was liberated, lifted out of a traditional Greek upbringing and pointed toward a future filled with wide horizons."

Headlines, their third studio album, appeared in August 1982. Joining Vanda and Young in the studio were Arnott; Alan Dansow; Lindsay Hammond on backing and lead vocals (on loan from Cheetah); Ian Miller on guitar; Ralph White on brass instruments and keyboards; and Stevie Wright on backing vocals, as well as lead vocals on two tracks, "Where Were You?" (July 1982) and "Waiting for a Train" (December 1982), both of which were issued as singles. McFarlane felt that Headlines "featured a more basic rock approach, but with no loss of power or originality." Headlines reached No. 13 on the Swedish Albums Chart.

Hammond's group, Cheetah, had been signed by Vanda & Young to Alberts in 1978. Arnott, Karski and Miller were all members of Cheetah during 1982, alongside Hammond and her sister, Chrissie. Wright was the duo's bandmate from the Easybeats, and they had written and produced material for his solo career, including his number one hit "Evie" (April 1974).

"Waiting for a Train" reached the top 100 in Australia, but had greater chart success in Europe when issued there in April 1983: it peaked at No. 7 in the UK, No. 15 in Belgium and No. 26 in the Netherlands. According to Duncan Kimball of MilesAgo, it is "a song with definite drug overtones that could well have been written about Stevie's predicament."

Late in 1984, they issued their fourth studio album, Early Morning Wake Up Call, which Neil Lade of The Canberra Times opined showed that the duo were "content to rest on their laurels... they have lapsed into the world of 'gimmick' songs... [and] an exercise of the bland and boring... Trite lyrics are made even more limp by droning vocal work." Their next studio album, Nights in France, appeared in October 1987 via Epic Records. It provided two singles, "Ayla" in September and "Money Don't Lie" in April 1988. Their final studio album, Burning up the Night, was issued in October 1992 with two further singles, "Burning up the Night" (October) and "Living on Dreams" (March 1993). Thereafter the duo concentrated on their songwriting and production work for other artists.

Discography

Studio albums

Compilations
Pan-orama (July 1983) Easy Beat (EASLP 100) – UK No. 69.
Flash Hits (1988) Cha Cha (001-1)
Collection (1990)
The Flash and the Pan Hits Collection (1996) Albert Productions / Epic Records (477106 2 / EPC 466950 2)
 Ayla The Best of Flash and the Pan (2005) Repertoire Records

Singles

References

General
  Note: Archived [on-line] copy has limited functionality.
Specific

External links

"Flash and the Pan", a discography, by Jonas Wårstad, retrieved 10 January 2017.

Australian new wave musical groups
Musical groups established in 1976
Musical groups disestablished in 1993
Synth-pop new wave musical groups
1976 establishments in Australia
1993 disestablishments in Australia
Musical groups from Sydney